Negaunee Township is a civil township of Marquette County in the U.S. state of Michigan. The population was 3,232 at the 2020 census. The city of Negaunee is located at the southwest corner of the township, but the two administered autonomously.

Communities
Eagle Mills A railroad station was established at this site in the township in 1855.  A sawmill was established here in 1873 and a post office began in 1877.  It operated periodically through 1912.

Geography

Demographics

As of the census of 2000, there were 2,707 people, 1,031 households, and 795 families residing in the township. The racial makeup of the township was 97.56% White, 0.07% African American, 0.92% Native American, 0.18% Asian, 0.04% Pacific Islander, 0.18% from other races, and 1.03% from two or more races. Hispanic or Latino of any race were 0.48% of the population.

There were 1,031 households, out of which 34.9% had children under the age of 18 living with them, 67.7% were married couples living together, 6.0% had a female householder with no husband present, and 22.8% were non-families. 19.0% of all households were made up of individuals, and 5.8% had someone living alone who was 65 years of age or older.  The average household size was 2.63 and the average family size was 3.02.

In the township the population was spread out, with 24.8% under the age of 18, 8.0% from 18 to 24, 30.1% from 25 to 44, 28.4% from 45 to 64, and 8.7% who were 65 years of age or older.  The median age was 38 years. For every 100 females, there were 103.8 males.  For every 100 females age 18 and over, there were 103.0 males.

The median income for a household in the township was $47,348, and the median income for a family was $55,283. Males had a median income of $40,132 versus $25,568 for females. The per capita income for the township was $18,894.  About 1.8% of families and 3.7% of the population were below the poverty line, including 2.2% of those under age 18 and 4.9% of those age 65 or over.

Highways

References

Notes

Sources

External links
Negaunee Township

Townships in Marquette County, Michigan
Townships in Michigan